Dr. Nur Luke was a Uyghur Bible translator from Hotan who converted to Christianity. He fled Xinjiang in the 1930s and together with Gustaf Ahlbert and Oskar Hermannson finished the translation of the Uyghur Bible in India. This was published by the British and Foreign Bible Society in 1946. Luke also wrote about the social structure of the Uyghur, noting 97-98 percent illiteracy.

Sources

External links
 Image of Dr. Nur Luke

Chinese Protestants
Chinese former Muslims
Uyghurs
Uyghur Christians
Translators of the Bible into Uyghur
Converts to Protestantism from Islam
Possibly living people
Year of birth missing